The chiwang (Dzongkha: སྤྱི་དབང་; Wylie: spyi-dbang) is a type of fiddle played in Bhutan. The chiwang, the lingm (flute), and the dramyen (lute) comprise the basic instrumental inventory for traditional Bhutanese folk music.

Although the chiwang is considered typically Bhutanese, it is a variety of the piwang, a Tibetan two-stringed fiddle. It is heavily associated with boedra, one of two dominant genres of Bhutanese folk music, in which it symbolizes a horse.

See also
Boedra
Music of Bhutan

References

Himalayan musical instruments
Bhutanese musical instruments
String instruments
Bowed instruments